María Orosa e Ylagan (November 29, 1892 – February 13, 1945) was a Filipina food technologist, pharmaceutical chemist, humanitarian, and war heroine. She experimented with foods native to the Philippines, and during World War II developed Soyalac (a nutrient rich drink from soybeans) and Darak (rice cookies packed with vitamin B-1, which prevents beriberi disease), which she also helped smuggle into Japanese-run internment camps that helped save the lives of thousands of Filipinos, Americans, and other nationals. She introduced to the public the well-known banana ketchup. 

Orosa completed her bachelor's and master's degrees in pharmaceutical chemistry, as well as an additional degree in food chemistry. She was then offered a position as an assistant chemist for the state of Washington before returning to the Philippines in 1922 to focus on addressing the problem of malnutrition in her homeland. She invented many types of food to minimize the need of imported products to feed Filipinos. She took advantage of the abundant natural resources of the Philippine islands such as native fruits, crops and vegetables to make the Philippines self-sufficient. 

During World War II, Orosa joined Marking's Guerrillas to fight for Philippines freedom. She invented over 700 recipes during her lifetime, including Soyalac and Darak, which saved thousands of lives during the war. She also invented a process for canning goods for the guerrilla warriors fighting for the liberation of the Philippines.  Without her food inventions, thousands of people would have died in internment camps, hospitals, and on the streets.

Early and family life

Orosa was born on November 29, 1892 in Taal, Batangas, and was the fourth among the eight children of Simplicio A. Orosa and Juliana Ylagan-Orosa. Although her father died when she was still a child (and helped her mother in the family's general store), many of her siblings also became distinguished in the Philippines. Her elder brother, Engr. Vicente Ylagan Orosa Sr., became Secretary of Public Works and Communications, and, later, Chairman of the People's Homesite and Housing Corporation (PHHC) during the administration of President Ramon Magsaysay. Her brother, Dr. Sixto Ylagan Orosa Sr., became a pioneering doctor, and her nieces and nephews included banker Sixto L. Orosa, Jr., Philippine National Artist in Dance Leonor Orosa Goquiñgco, businessman José R. L. Orosa, award-winning cultural journalist Rosalinda L. Orosa, and her biographer Helen Orosa del Rosario.

As a government-sponsored scholar, Orosa earned a bachelor's and master's degrees in pharmaceutical chemistry, and an additional degree in food chemistry from the University of Washington. She worked in fish canneries in Alaska during her summer breaks in college.

Career

Although offered a job as an assistant chemist by the Washington state government, Orosa returned to the Philippines in 1922. She initially taught home economics at the Centro Escolar University, and later transferred to the Philippine Bureau of Science's food preservation division. Orosa wanted to help the Philippines become self-sufficient, as well as empower Filipino families. She organized 4-H clubs in the islands (which had more than 22,000 members by 1924), and traveled into the barrios to teach women how to raise chickens, preserve local produce, and plan healthy meals. Orosa invented the palayok oven to enable families without access to electricity to bake, and developed recipes for local produce, including cassava, bananas, and coconut. Her banana ketchup became a favorite condiment and cooking ingredient in the archipelago. She also developed wines and calamansi nip, a desiccated and powdered form of a citrus fruit also used to make reconstituted calamansi juice, banana ketchup, and is also used in other recipes. Orosa ultimately became the head of the Home Economics Division and organized its Division of Food Preservation. Using both her local and technical knowledge, Orosa made culinary contributions and taught proper preservation methods for native dishes such as adobo, dinuguan, kilawin and escabeche.

During World War II, Orosa used her food science background to invent Soyalac (a protein-rich powdered soybean product) and Darak (a rice bran powder rich in thiamine and other vitamins which could also treat beri-beri). She also became a captain in Marking's Guerrillas, a Filipino guerrilla group organized by Marcos "Marking" V. Augustín. The guerrillas helped U.S. forces fight the occupying Japanese troops and employed carpenters to insert Soyalac and Darak into hollow bamboo sticks, which were smuggled to the civilians imprisoned at the University of Santo Tomas and in Japanese-run prisoners of war camps in Capas, Tarlac and Corregidor. The powders saved the lives of many starving imprisoned guerrillas and U.S. soldiers. Her "Tiki-Tiki" cookies (made using Darak) also saved many civilian lives during wartime food shortages.

Death and legacy

Although her family and friends urged her to leave Manila for her hometown as American, Filipino, and Japanese forces battled to control the city, Orosa refused, insisting that, as a soldier, she needed to remain at her post. On February 13, 1945, Orosa died of shrapnel wounds after being hit in her government office during an American bombing raid. The hospital to which she had been taken was later also bombed, causing a shrapnel shard to pierce her heart and kill her instantly. The American Red Cross gave Orosa a humanitarian award for her food-smuggling efforts. Her niece Helen Orosa del Rosario in 1970 published Maria Orosa: Her Life and Work, which also included 700 of Orosa's recipes.

The Philippines has officially recognized Orosa's contributions. Her home province, Batangas, installed a bust and historical marker in her honor. A street in Ermita, Manila (where the Court of Appeals of the Philippines is located), is named after her, as is a building in the Bureau of Plant Industry. During the 65th anniversary of the Institute of Science and Technology, she became one of 19 scientists who received special recognition. On November 29, 1983, the National Historical Institute installed a marker in her honor at the Bureau of Plant Industry in Malate, Manila. In commemoration of her centennial birth anniversary, the Philippine Postal Corporation issued a postage stamp in her honor. Her hometown of Taal, Batangas also celebrated the 125th anniversary of her birth on November 29, 2018. On 29 November 2019, Google celebrated her 126th birthday with a Google Doodle.

On February 8, 2020, Orosa's tombstone was found at the Malate Catholic School, the site of the Remedios Hospital during the Second World War. The excavation was led by Isabel Picornell. It has been suggested that her body be transferred to the Libingan ng mga Bayani (LNMB) in Taguig.

List of works
The history and chemistry of norsphenamine (1921)
Preservation of Philippine foods (1926)
Rice bran: a health food and how to cook it (1932)
Roselle recipes (1931)
Soy beans as a component of a balanced diet and how to prepare them (1932)
Preserve the national culture in local food (1932)

References

Sources 
Ancheta, Herminia M. and Michaela Beltran-Gonzales, Filipino Women in Nation Building, Phoenix Publishing House Inc., Quezon City, 1984. 

http://worldcat.org/identities/lccn-no2009093773/

Centro Escolar University (2019) CEU-SNHM Pays Tribute to Filipina Innovator Maria Orosa. https://manila.ceu.edu.ph/ceu-snhm-pays-tribute-to-filipina-food-innovator-maria-orosa

Cite Seer X http://citeseerx.ist.psu.edu/viewdoc/download?doi=10.1.1.504.4716&rep=rep1&type=pdf

Republic of the Philippines News Agency (2019). Google honors Filipina scientist Maria Orosa. https://www.pna.gov.ph/index.php/articles/1087406

Further reading

Orosa, Maria Y. and Helen Orosa del Rosario. (1970). Maria Y. Orosa, Her Life and Work (Helen Orosa del Rosario, Ed.). [Quezon City:] R. P. Garcia Pub. Co.

1890s births
1945 deaths
Filipino chemists
Filipino women chemists
People from Taal, Batangas
University of Washington alumni
University of the Philippines Manila alumni
Filipino military personnel of World War II
Filipino military personnel killed in World War II
Deaths by airstrike during World War II
Recipients of the Presidential Medal of Merit (Philippines)